Pedro Pérez Pimentel (April 11, 1904 in Vieques, Puerto Rico – August 23, 1990) served as a served as an Associate Justice for the Puerto Rico Supreme Court and Chief Justice of the Supreme Court of Puerto Rico from 1972 until 1974.

Graduated in law from the University of Puerto Rico School of Law in 1927. Went to private practice and later as a legal advisor for the Puerto Rico Department of Treasury. Worked at district judge in Humacao, Guayama and San Juan. In 1952 Puerto Rico governor Luis Muñoz Marín appointed Pedro Pérez Pimentel as Associate Justice for the Puerto Rico Supreme Court. In 1972 was named acting Chief Justice and in 1973 was nominated as permanent Chief Justice by governor Rafael Hernández Colón. Served as Chief Justice until his retirement in 1974.

References
http://www.ramajudicial.pr/sistema/supremo/presidentes/dejesus-new.htm

|-

1904 births
1990 deaths
Chief Justices of the Supreme Court of Puerto Rico
People from Vieques, Puerto Rico
Puerto Rican judges
University of Puerto Rico alumni
20th-century American judges